Jaspat Rai, was a minister of Mughal Court, Mughal official, was the faujdar of Jalandhar and later was appointed faujdar of Eminabad by Zakariya Khan Bahadur. In the year 1746, he was killed in an encounter with bands of Sikhs under Jassa Singh Ahluwalia.

Lakhpat Rai 
Lakhpat Rai was the brother of Jaspat Rai. Lakhpat was the revenue minister of Lahore and wanted to take revenge on the Sikhs.  Yahya Khan, (Governor of Lahore) helped him in a large scale massacre of Sikhs called the Chhota Ghallughara, in which an estimated 7,000 Sikhs were killed. He was later tortured and killed by the Sikhs.

References 

1746 deaths
Year of birth missing
Mughal Empire people
Massacres of Sikhs
Jalandhar